The Girl Friend is a 1935 American musical comedy film directed by Edward Buzzell and starring Ann Sothern, Jack Haley and Roger Pryor.

Main cast
 Ann Sothern as Linda Henry 
 Jack Haley as Henry A. Henry 
 Roger Pryor as George Thorne 
 Thurston Hall as George S. Harmon 
 Victor Kilian as Sunshine Minton 
 Ray Walker as Doc Parks 
 Inez Courtney as Hilda 
 Margaret Seddon as Grandma Henry
 Lillian Rich as English Lady 
 Buddy Roosevelt as Chauffeur
 Marie Wilson as Chorus Girl in Play 
 Dennis O'Keefe as Soldier in Play

References

Bibliography
 Monaco, James. The Encyclopedia of Film. Perigee Books, 1991.

External links

1935 films
American musical comedy films
American black-and-white films
1935 musical comedy films
1930s English-language films
Films directed by Edward Buzzell
Columbia Pictures films
1930s American films